Santhana Bharathi is an Indian film director and actor who has primarily worked in Tamil cinema.  He directed Guna (1991), which won third prize for the Tamil Nadu State Film Award for Best Film. He also directed Mahanadhi (1994), which won the National Film Award for Best Feature Film in Tamil and the Tamil Nadu State Film Award Special Prize.

Family 
Bharathi's father M. R. Santhanam was an actor and producer, one of the earliest members of the Nadigar Sangam. His brother R. S. Shivaji is also an actor. Bharathi's son Sanjay Bharathi is also a director.

Filmography

As actor

Television

As director 
 All works in Tamil unless noted otherwise

References

External links 

Living people
Tamil male actors
Tamil film directors
Male actors from Chennai
Film directors from Chennai
People from Dindigul district
20th-century Indian film directors
20th-century Indian male actors
21st-century Indian male actors
Male actors in Tamil cinema
Telugu film directors
Year of birth missing (living people)
Place of birth missing (living people)